DYWC (801 AM) Radyo Bandilyo is a radio station owned and operated by Franciscan Broadcasting Corporation, the media arm of the Diocese of Dumaguete. Its studios and transmitter facilities are located at the Parish Compound, Brgy. Poblacion, Sibulan.

DYWC was founded in 1965 by the Franciscan friars in Guihulngan. In 1980, after the Diocese of Dumaguete took over the station, it transferred its operations to its current location in Sibulan. It is currently a member of the Catholic Media Network. It is affiliated with Radio Mindanao Network for its local news/talk programming, national news from DZXL in Manila and radio dramas from DYHP in Cebu City.

References

Radio stations in Dumaguete
Radio stations established in 1965